Marina Matrosova (born July 2, 1990) is a cross-country skier from Kazakhstan who has competed since 2008. At the 2010 Winter Olympics in Vancouver, she finished 35th in the 30 km event and 48th both in the individual sprint and 7.5 km + 7.5 km double pursuit events.

Matrosova's best World Cup finish was 12th in a team sprint event while her best individual finish was 40th in a 15 km event at Slovenia in December 2009.

References

1990 births
Cross-country skiers at the 2010 Winter Olympics
Kazakhstani female cross-country skiers
Tour de Ski skiers
Living people
Olympic cross-country skiers of Kazakhstan
Cross-country skiers at the 2017 Asian Winter Games
Universiade bronze medalists for Kazakhstan
Universiade medalists in cross-country skiing
Competitors at the 2013 Winter Universiade
Competitors at the 2015 Winter Universiade
21st-century Kazakhstani women